The Unlawful Societies Act 1799 (39 Geo. III c79) was an Act passed by the Parliament of Great Britain in 1799, as part of measures by Pitt the Younger to suppress republican opposition. It is also sometimes referred to as the Corresponding Societies Act.

Synopsis
The Act against Unlawful Combinations and Confederacies (39 Geo. III c81) is sometimes confused with the present Act, possibly because that Act followed the present Act in close proximity.

The Act was aimed at restricting the activities of radical secret societies like the London Corresponding Society and Society of United Irishmen. The LCS, United Irishmen, United Englishmen, United Britons and United Scots were proscribed by the Act. To prevent similar societies springing up, it was made illegal for any society to require its members to take an oath. Societies were also required to keep lists of members available for inspection. A magistrate's licence was required for any premises on which public lectures were held or any fee-charging public reading room. Printers were closely regulated, because one of the main problems in the Government's view was that seditious pamphlets were widely circulated and untraceable. Anyone possessing printing equipment was required to register, while all printed items were required to carry the name and address of the printer on the title-page and/or the final page (see colophon), and printers were required to declare all items they had printed to magistrates and retain copies for inspection.

During the passage of the Bill exemptions were introduced to avoid unwanted consequences of the broadly-drafted law. Papers that Parliament itself had ordered to be printed, for instance, were not required to carry an imprint. Freemasons, who required members to swear oaths upon joining, successfully lobbied to avoid their society being banned. In the end any Masonic lodge existing at the time of passage of the Act was exempted, so long as they maintained a list of members and supplied it to the magistrates.

The Act was not particularly effective, as radical political organisations continued in more secret or less formal ways. Even where prosecutions could have been made under the Act, other legislation was preferred. Significant parts of the law were repealed under the Newspapers Printers and Reading Rooms Repeal Act 1869, while others continued in force (albeit obsolete and deprecated) until the Criminal Justice Act 1967. The most long-lived provision of the Act has been the requirement for printers to place an "imprint" on their work. This provision was relaxed in the Printer's Imprint Act 1961 to exclude simple documents like greetings cards or invoice books. At that time apparently some unscrupulous customers requested the printer omit their imprint, and then refused to pay their bills on the grounds that the work had been conducted illegally. The imprint requirement as amended in 1961 is technically still in force, but widely considered obsolete. A similar, but more detailed, provision was introduced in section 143 of the Political Parties, Elections and Referendums Act 2000 to require the disclosure of printer, publisher and promoter of any material produced as part of an election campaign.

References

Great Britain Acts of Parliament 1799
Political repression in the United Kingdom